Mar D'Outubro (Portuguese words for "October sea") is Sétima Legião second album released in 1987. It's one of the most commercially successful album by the band, including singles like Sete Mares (Seven Seas) and Noutro Lugar (Another Place).

Track listing

Personnel
Rodrigo Leão - Bass, Guitar, Vocals
Nuno Cruz - Drums 
Gabriel Gomes - Accordion
Paulo Gabriel - Bagpipes, Wind (Bombard), Flute
Ricardo Camacho - Guitar, Keyboards
Pedro Oliveira - Guitar, Lead Vocals
Paulo Abelho - Percussion

Technical personnel
Amândio Bastos - Sound Engineer
José Manuel Santa-Bárbara - Back Cover Photography
José Pedro Santa-Bárbara - Cover Photography
Ricardo Camacho - Producer
Paulo Neves - Technician Assistant

Portuguese-language albums
1987 albums